The waṣla or  ('hamza of connection') is an Arabic diacritic resembling part of the letter  that is sometimes placed over the letter  at the beginning of the word. It indicates that the alif is not pronounced as a glottal stop (written with the letter or diacritic hamza ), but that the word is connected to the previous word (like liaison in French).

Examples 
 
   — And his daughter's name is Hind.
   — He wants to read to one of his two daughters.
   — What is your name?

References

Arabic diacritics